This is a list of songs that charted in the top ten of the ARIA Charts in 2021. In 2021 twenty-two acts, Olivia Rodrigo, Glass Animals, Spacey Jane, Hvme, 6lack, Willow Sage Hart, Masked Wolf, Silk Sonic, Daniel Caesar, Giveon, Polo G, Russ Millions, Tion Wayne, Måneskin, Stunna Gambino, Lil Baby, Future, CKay, The Anxiety, Gayle, Acraze and Cherish reached the top ten for the first time.

Top-ten singles

Key

2018 peaks

2020 peaks

2022 peaks 

Notes:

Notes:
Miley Cyrus is credited on a remix of The Kid Laroi's "Without You", with her name appearing on the song beginning with the chart dated May 17, 2021. Prior to that week, The Kid Laroi was the sole artist credit.
The singles re-entered the top 10 on 4 January 2021.
The singles re-entered the top 10 on 25 January 2021.
The singles re-entered the top 10 on 8 February 2021.
The singles re-entered the top 10 on 15 February 2021.
The singles re-entered the top 10 on 22 February 2021.
The singles re-entered the top 10 on 1 March 2021.
The singles re-entered the top 10 on 5 April 2021.
The singles re-entered the top 10 on 3 May 2021.
The singles re-entered the top 10 on 17 May 2021.
The singles re-entered the top 10 on 31 May 2021.
The singles re-entered the top 10 on 7 June 2021.
The singles re-entered the top 10 on 14 June 2021.
The singles re-entered the top 10 on 28 June 2021.
The singles re-entered the top 10 on 19 July 2021.
The singles re-entered the top 10 on 26 July 2021.
The singles re-entered the top 10 on 2 August 2021.
The singles re-entered the top 10 on 6 September 2021.
The singles re-entered the top 10 on 20 September 2021.
The singles re-entered the top 10 on 27 September 2021.
The singles re-entered the top 10 on 11 October 2021.

See also
 List of number-one singles of 2021 (Australia)

References

Australia Singles Top 10
Top 10 singles
Top 10 singles 2021
Australia 2021